Pablo Martin Sarmiento (June 29, 1942 - August 27, 1998), better known as Babalu, was a Filipino comedian and actor. His screen name was a reference to his long, sharp chin ("baba" is the Filipino term for "chin") of which was sometimes a subject of on screen ridicule, usually by himself.

Personal life
He grew up in Sampaloc, Manila in his grandmother's home with his mother, one sister and three brothers. Babalu fathered a son. For several years and until his death, he was living with his long-time partner who eventually became his wife prior to his death, with whom he had a child.

Acting career
Babalu is considered "one of the most famous, beloved, and greatest comedians" in the Philippines. He is the nephew of the famous actor Panchito Alba. Dolphy, the king of Philippine Comedy, discovered Babalu's talent as a comedian. Babalu was given a featured role on the Philippines' leading comedy-variety show Buhay Artista. His appearances in movies and television included the shows Home Along Da Riles and Oki Doki Doc. Babalu's life story was featured on the television show Maalaala Mo Kaya "Imahe ng Berhen" on July 3, 2003.

Filmography

Film

Television

Death
Babalu was warned of his health condition in March 1998 but kept his health problems a secret from his co-stars, particularly from Aga Muhlach and the others in the weekly TV shows Oki Doki Doc and Home Along Da Riles, wherein he was a regular cast.

Writer Nene Riego, a close friend of Babalu, said the actor asked his doctor to tell him the truth about his ailment. Babalu was told he only had six months to live. He decided to seek further treatment in Michigan. Doctors there had the same diagnosis and advised him to spend the rest of his life in the Philippines. Babalu came back home on August 14, thin and weak.

Babalu's last two movies were Tataynic with Dolphy and Tong Tatlong Tatay Kong Pakitong-kitong together with Redford White, Bonel Balingit and Serena Dalrymple. He died of liver cirrhosis on August 27, 1998, two months after his 56th birthday, in his home in Antipolo. He was buried in Loyola Memorial Park in Parañaque. The film Tar-San is dedicated to his memory.

References

External links
 

1942 births
1998 deaths
20th-century comedians
20th-century Filipino male actors
Burials at the Loyola Memorial Park
Deaths from cancer in the Philippines
Deaths from cirrhosis
Filipino male comedians
Filipino male film actors
Filipino male television actors
Filipino television personalities
Male actors from Manila
People from Antipolo
People from Sampaloc, Manila